John Bucknill may refer to:

Sir John Charles Bucknill, English psychiatrist and mental health reformer
Sir John Alexander Strachey Bucknill, British lawyer and colonial judge (and grandson of John Charles Bucknill)